Alnico is a family of iron alloys which in addition to iron are composed primarily of aluminium (Al), nickel (Ni), and cobalt (Co), hence the acronym al-ni-co. They also include copper, and sometimes titanium. Alnico alloys are ferromagnetic, and are used to make permanent magnets. Before the development of rare-earth magnets in the 1970s, they were the strongest type of permanent magnet. Other trade names for alloys in this family are: Alni, Alcomax, Hycomax, Columax, and Ticonal.

The composition of alnico alloys is typically 8–12% Al, 15–26% Ni, 5–24% Co, up to 6% Cu, up to 1% Ti, and the rest is Fe. The development of alnico began in 1931, when T. Mishima in Japan discovered that an alloy of iron, nickel, and aluminium had a coercivity of 
, double that of the best magnet steels of the time.

Properties
Alnico alloys can be magnetised to produce strong magnetic fields and have a high coercivity (resistance to demagnetization), thus making strong permanent magnets. Of the more commonly available magnets, only rare-earth magnets such as neodymium and samarium-cobalt are stronger. Alnico magnets produce magnetic field strength at their poles as high as 1500 gauss (0.15 tesla), or about 3000 times the strength of Earth's magnetic field. Some brands of alnico are isotropic and can be efficiently magnetized in any direction. Other types, such as alnico 5 and alnico 8, are anisotropic, with each having a preferred direction of magnetization, or orientation. Anisotropic alloys generally have greater magnetic capacity in a preferred orientation than isotropic types. Alnico's remanence (Br) may exceed 12,000 G (1.2 T), its coercivity (Hc) can be up to 1000 oersteds (80 kA/m), its maximum energy product ((BH)max) can be up to 5.5 MG·Oe (44 T·A/m). This means that alnico can produce a strong magnetic flux in closed magnetic circuits, but has relatively small resistance against demagnetization. The field strength at the poles of any permanent magnet depends very much on the shape and is usually well below the remanence strength of the material.

They are the only magnets that have useful magnetism even when heated red-hot. This property, as well as its brittleness and high melting point, is the result of the strong tendency toward order due to intermetallic bonding between aluminium and other constituents. They are also one of the most stable magnets if they are handled properly. Alnico magnets are electrically conductive, unlike ceramic magnets.

As of 2018, Alnico magnets cost about 44 USD/kg (US$20/lb) or US$4.30/BHmax.

Classification
Alnico magnets are traditionally classified using numbers assigned by the Magnetic Materials Producers Association (MMPA), for example, alnico 3 or alnico 5. These classifications indicate chemical composition and magnetic properties. (The classification numbers themselves do not have any direct relation to the properties of the magnet; for instance, a higher number does not necessarily indicate a stronger magnet.)

These classification numbers, while still in use, have been deprecated in favor of a new system by the MMPA, which designates Alnico magnets based on maximum energy product in megagauss-oersteds and intrinsic coercive force as kilooersteds, as well as an IEC classification system.

Manufacturing process

Alnico magnets are produced by casting or sintering processes.  Cast alnico is produced by conventional methods using resin bonded sand molds.  Sintered alnico magnets are formed using powdered metal manufacturing methods. Sintering alnico is suitable for complex geometries.

Most alnico produced is anisotropic, meaning that the magnetic direction of the grains is oriented in one direction. Anisotropic alnico magnets are oriented by heating above a critical temperature and cooling in the presence of a magnetic field. Both isotropic and anisotropic alnico require proper heat treatment to develop optimal magnetic properties—without it alnico's coercivity is about 10 Oe, comparable to technical iron, which is a soft magnetic material. After the heat treatment alnico becomes a composite material, named "precipitation material"—it consists of iron- and cobalt-rich precipitates in rich-NiAl matrix. Without an external field there are local anisotropies of different orientations due to spontaneous magnetization. The precipitate structure is a "barrier" against magnetization changes, as it prefers few magnetization states requiring much energy to get the material into any intermediate state. Also, a weak magnetic field shifts the magnetization of the matrix phase only and is reversible.

Uses

Alnico magnets are widely used in industrial and consumer applications where strong permanent magnets are needed; examples are electric motors, electric guitar pickups, microphones, sensors, loudspeakers, magnetron tubes, and cow magnets. In many applications they are being superseded by rare-earth magnets, whose stronger fields (Br) and larger energy products (B·Hmax) allow smaller-size magnets to be used for a given application.

The high temperature resistance of alnico magnets leads to many uses that cannot be filled by less resistant magnets, such as in magnetic stirring hotplates.

References

Further reading
MMPA 0100-00, Standard Specifications for Permanent Magnet Materials

Ferrous alloys
Magnetic alloys
Ferromagnetic materials
Loudspeakers
Nickel alloys